Mammillaria grahamii is a species of cactus also known by the name Graham's nipple cactus.

In the United States, this plant can be found in Arizona, California, New Mexico, and Texas.

Description
This cactus has hooked stems and flowers pink or lavender in April and May. The cactus is commonly found in a dry habitat of gravel or grassland.

Propagating
At the bottom of this plant you will find some mini cactus branches. You can cut it off, let the wound dry and plant it in cactus soil. After a few weeks you can pull a bit to check if it has roots. If it doesn’t but looks still healthy you should wait more.

References

Calflora Database: Mammillaria grahamii

grahamii
Cacti of Mexico
Cacti of the United States
Flora of the California desert regions
Flora of the Chihuahuan Desert
Flora of the Sonoran Deserts
Flora of Arizona
Flora of Baja California
Flora of New Mexico
Flora of Sonora
Flora of Texas
Natural history of the Colorado Desert
North American desert flora